Slack Farmstead is a historic farm complex and national historic district located at Mexico in Oswego County, New York.  The district includes four contributing structures; the farmhouse, a dairy barn (1870), granary (c. 1850) and a hen house (c. 1910).  Also on the property are a contributing stone wall, hand-dug well, and farm pond. The farmhouse is a five-bay, -story frame building with a gable roof built about 1838.

It was listed on the National Register of Historic Places in 1991.

References

Farms on the National Register of Historic Places in New York (state)
Historic districts on the National Register of Historic Places in New York (state)
Historic districts in Oswego County, New York
National Register of Historic Places in Oswego County, New York